Mark Hylton may refer to:

 Mark Hylton (sprinter) (born 1976), former British 400 metres sprinter
 Mark Hylton (darts player) (born 1966), English darts player

See also
Mark Hilton (disambiguation)